WFGI-FM (95.5 MHz, "Froggy 95.5") is a Froggy branded country music formatted radio station in Pennsylvania serving the Johnstown area. The station is owned and operated by Seven Mountains Media, LLC.

History

The station began at 96.5 (now WKYE) as WJNL-FM in 1973 as the sister station to WJNL. They played easy to listen to music and had news updates hourly.  It was known as this until it was purchased in 1996 by Clear Channel Communications. Then it became "96.5 the Mountain" with the callsign WMTZ and began playing country music.  In 2005, Clear Channel decided to leave the Johnstown market and sold its station properties to Altoona-based Forever Broadcasting.  Forever wanted to expand its Froggyland into the Pittsburgh area and the 96.5 signal was not able to do so.  The 95.5 signal was able to with no problem, so in February 2005 the station became Froggy 95 (as it is still today).

It was announced on October 12, 2022 that Forever Media is selling 34 stations, including WFGI-FM and its entire Johnstown cluster, to State College-based Seven Mountains Media for $17.3 million. The deal closed on January 2, 2023.

Signal abilities
WFGI-FM has a very strong signal that can be heard as far west as western suburbs of Pittsburgh and even eastern Ohio and as far east as Mifflin County, where it starts conflicting with WMRF on 95.7 FM from Lewistown.  In recent years however the coverage area has faded, due to short space same and adjacent stations (e.g. WRSC-FM on 95.3 FM from Bellefonte) and also weather conditions having effect on coverage presumably from flora.

Multipath issues
WFGI-FM has always suffered from signal degradation in the city of license, primarily because of the excessive height above the city as well as multipath caused by the local terrain of the Allegheny plateau.  There are multiple areas in Johnstown that cause that station to have multipath.

References

External links

FGY
Radio stations established in 1971